The following are lists of airports by IATA code and ICAO code:

By IATA code

By ICAO code

Airports by IATA code